1920 in sports describes the year's events in world sport.

American football
 NFL championship – Akron Pros (8–0–3)
 Rose Bowl (1919 season):
 The Harvard Crimson won 7–6 over the Oregon Webfoots to win the college football national championship
 17 September — the National Football League (NFL) is founded as the American Professional Football Association in Canton, Ohio. Of the teams in the current NFL, only the Decatur Staleys (renamed the Chicago Bears) and the Racine (Chicago) Cardinals (the current Arizona Cardinals) remain in existence.  
 14 December — Death of Notre Dame player George Gipp (1895–1920), mainly remembered for his deathbed quote to coach Knute Rockne: "Win just one for the Gipper".

Association football
 First women's international football game takes place between a French team and an English team with 25,000 spectators in attendance.
England
 The Football League – West Bromwich Albion 60 points, Burnley 51, Chelsea 49, Liverpool 48, Sunderland 48, Bolton Wanderers 47
 FA Cup final – Aston Villa 1–0 Huddersfield Town (after extra time) at Stamford Bridge, London
 The Football League is expanded by the formation of the original Third Division.  New clubs admitted to the league include Leeds United and Cardiff City, who are both elected to the Second Division.  New members in the Third Division are: Brentford, Brighton & Hove Albion, Bristol Rovers, Crystal Palace, Exeter City, Gillingham, Luton Town, Merthyr Town (1920 – 1930), Millwall, Newport County (1920 – 1988), Northampton Town, Norwich City, Plymouth Argyle, Portsmouth, Queens Park Rangers (QPR), Reading, Southampton, Southend United, Swansea Town, Swindon Town and Watford.
Germany
 National Championship – 1. FC Nürnberg 2–0 SpVgg Fürth at Frankfurt

Athletics
Men's 100 metres
 Jackson Scholz (USA) equals the world record of 10.6 seconds.

Australian rules football
VFL Premiership
 2 October – Richmond wins the 24th VFL Premiership, defeating Collingwood 7.10 (52) to 5.5 (35) in the Grand Final
South Australian Football League
 18 September – North Adelaide defeat Norwood 10.9 (69) to 3.3 (21) to win its fourth SAFL premiership.
West Australian Football League
 25 September – East Perth defeats East Fremantle 6.16 (52) to 4.6 (30) to win its second consecutive premiership.

Bandy
Sweden
 Championship final – IFK Uppsala 3–2 IF Linnéa

Baseball
World Series
 5–12 October — Cleveland Indians (AL) defeats Brooklyn Dodgers (NL) by 5 games to 2 to win the 1920 World Series
Major League Baseball
 The sale of Babe Ruth. Boston Red Sox transfers Babe Ruth to New York Yankees for $125,000 and a $350,000 loan.  Ruth hits 54 home runs for the Yankees in 1920, nearly double the record of 29 he hit in the 1919 season.
 16 August — Ray Chapman of Cleveland Indians is hit on the head by a fastball from Carl Mays of New York Yankees. He dies early next day, the second fatality of major league play.
 Chicago White Sox stars Eddie Cicotte and Shoeless Joe Jackson confess their roles in the Black Sox scandal
Negro leagues
 13 February — the Negro National League is formed
 2 May — the first game of the new league is played at Indianapolis with the Indianapolis ABCs defeating the Chicago Giants (not to be confused with the Chicago American Giants)
 Chicago American Giants wins the inaugural Negro National League pennant

Basketball
Italy
 A first match held on professional league of Italy, Lega Basket Serie A.

Boxing
Events
 6 May – Johnny Wilson wins the World Middleweight Championship by defeating Mike O'Dowd in 12 rounds at Boston.
 12 October – Georges Carpentier wins the World Light Heavyweight Championship after he knocks out Battling Levinsky in the 4th round at Jersey City, his victory setting up the first "million dollar gate" when he fights Jack Dempsey in 1921.
 22 December – Joe Lynch defeats Pete Herman in 15 rounds at New York to win the World Bantamweight Championship.
Lineal world champions
 World Heavyweight Championship – Jack Dempsey
 World Light Heavyweight Championship – Battling Levinsky → Georges Carpentier
 World Middleweight Championship – Mike O'Dowd → Johnny Wilson
 World Welterweight Championship – Jack Britton
 World Lightweight Championship – Benny Leonard
 World Featherweight Championship – Johnny Kilbane
 World Bantamweight Championship – Pete Herman → Joe Lynch
 World Flyweight Championship – Jimmy Wilde

Canadian football
Grey Cup
 8th Grey Cup – University of Toronto Varsity Blues 16–3 Toronto Argonauts

Cricket
Events
 Post-war recovery continues and an English team goes to Australia in November to commence the first Test series since the war.
 Derbyshire suffer the ignominy of a perfectly bad season, losing all seventeen county matches with any play. This is the second and last time this has occurred in county cricket, and the only time in the official County Championship.
England
 County Championship – Middlesex
 Minor Counties Championship – Staffordshire
 Most runs – Jack Hobbs 2827 @ 58.89 (HS 215)
 Most wickets – Frank Woolley 185 @ 14.23 (BB 7–59)  
 Wisden Cricketer of the Year – Plum Warner
Australia
 Sheffield Shield – New South Wales 
 Most runs – Roy Park 648 @ 72.00 (HS 228) 
 Most wickets – Stork Hendry 29 @ 18.13 (BB 7–34)
India
 Bombay Quadrangular – Hindus
New Zealand
 Plunket Shield – Auckland
South Africa
 Currie Cup – Western Province
West Indies
 Inter-Colonial Tournament – not contested

Cycling
Tour de France
 Philippe Thys (Belgium) wins the 14th Tour de France
Giro d'Italia
 Gaetano Belloni of Bianchi wins the eighth Giro d'Italia

Field hockey
Olympic Games (Men's Competition)
 Gold Medal – Great Britain
 Silver Medal – Denmark
 Bronze Medal – Belgium

Figure skating
World Figure Skating Championships
 The championships are not contested
1920 Summer Olympics
 Men's individual – Gillis Grafström (Sweden)
 Women's individual – Magda Mauroy-Julin (Sweden)
 Pairs – Ludowika Jakobsson and Walter Jakobsson (Finland)

Golf
Major tournaments
 British Open – George Duncan
 US Open – Ted Ray
 USPGA Championship – Jock Hutchison
Other tournaments
 British Amateur – Cyril Tolley
 US Amateur – Chick Evans

Horse racing
Events
 The inaugural Prix de l'Arc de Triomphe is won by Comrade
England
 Grand National – Troytown
 1,000 Guineas Stakes – Cinna
 2,000 Guineas Stakes – Tetratema
 The Derby – Spion Kop
 The Oaks – Charlebelle
 St. Leger Stakes – Caligula
Australia
 Melbourne Cup – Poitrel
Canada
 King's Plate – St. Paul
France
 Prix de l'Arc de Triomphe – Comrade
Ireland
 Irish Grand National – Halston
 Irish Derby Stakes – He Goes 
USA
 Kentucky Derby – Paul Jones
 Preakness Stakes – Man o' War
 Belmont Stakes – Man o' War

Ice hockey
Events
 Ice hockey is held at the 1920 Summer Olympics and is the second winter sport to feature at the Olympics — 4 years before the inaugural Winter Games is held
1920 Summer Olympics
 Gold Medal – Canada
 Silver Medal – USA
 Bronze Medal – Czechoslovakia
Stanley Cup
 22 March – 1 April — Ottawa Senators (NHL) defeats Seattle Metropolitans (PCHA) in the 1920 Stanley Cup Finals by three games to two 
Events
 Allan Cup – Winnipeg Falcons
 1920 Memorial Cup – Toronto Canoe Club Paddlers defeated Selkirk Fishermen by two game total of 15-5
 22 December — Hamilton Tigers, the reconstituted Quebec Bulldogs franchise, wins its first-ever NHL game in Hamilton, defeating Montreal Canadiens 5–0

Motorsport

Olympic Games
1920 Summer Olympics
 The 1920 Summer Olympics takes place in Antwerp
 The 1916 Summer Olympics planned for Berlin having been cancelled due to World War I, the 1920 Games are awarded to Antwerp to "honour the suffering of the Belgian people"
 United States wins the most medals (95) and the most gold medals (41)

Rowing
The Boat Race
 28 March — Cambridge wins the 72nd Oxford and Cambridge Boat Race, contested for the first time since March 1914

Rugby league
The 1920 Great Britain Lions tour of Australia and New Zealand takes place mid-year.
England
 Championship – Hull
 Challenge Cup final – Huddersfield 21–10 Wigan at Headingley Rugby Stadium, Leeds 
 Lancashire League Championship – Widnes
 Yorkshire League Championship – Huddersfield
 Lancashire County Cup – Oldham 7–0 Rochdale Hornets 
 Yorkshire County Cup – Huddersfield 24–5 Leeds
Australia
 NSW Premiership – Balmain (outright winner)

Rugby union
Five Nations Championship
 33rd Five Nations Championship series is shared by England, Scotland and Wales

Speed skating
Speed Skating World Championships
 not contested

Tennis
Australia
 Australian Men's Singles Championship – Pat O'Hara Wood (Australia) defeats Ronald Thomas (Australia) 6–3 4–6 6–8 6–1 6–3  
England
 Wimbledon Men's Singles Championship – Bill Tilden (USA) defeats Gerald Patterson (Australia) 2–6 6–3 6–2 6–4
 Wimbledon Women's Singles Championship – Suzanne Lenglen (France) defeats Dorothea Douglass Lambert Chambers (GB) 6–3 6–0
France
 French Men's Singles Championship – André Gobert (France) defeats Max Decugis (France) 6–3 3–6 1–6 6–2 6–3 
 French Women's Singles Championship – Suzanne Lenglen (France) defeats Marguerite Broquedis (France) 6–1 7–5 
USA
 American Men's Singles Championship – Bill Tilden (USA) defeats Bill Johnston (USA) 6–1 1–6 7–5 5–7 6–3
 American Women's Singles Championship – Molla Bjurstedt Mallory (Norway) defeats Marion Zinderstein (USA) 6–3 6–1
Davis Cup
 1920 International Lawn Tennis Challenge –  5–0  at Domain Cricket Club (grass) Auckland, New Zealand

Yacht racing
America's Cup
 The New York Yacht Club retains the America's Cup as Resolute defeats British challenger Shamrock IV, of the Royal Ulster Yacht Club, 10 races to 2

References

 
Sports by year